Overloading (also overworking) is a chess tactic in which a defensive piece is given an additional defensive assignment which it cannot complete without abandoning its original defensive assignment.

Examples

Krasenkow–Karpov, in the first round of the 2003 Corus chess tournament, reached the diagrammed position with Black to play. As the white rook on f1 is preventing the black queen from giving checkmate by capturing the pawn on f3, Black won immediately with 
29... Re1

further pinning the white rook against the king and overloading the rook. White now cannot prevent the black queen from taking the f-pawn: if White tries to protect the rook with 30.Rxe1 or 30.Qc4, then 30...Qxf3. If White sacrifices the rook by playing 30.Kg2, then 30...Rxf1 31.Kxf1 Qxf3+ and loses the other rook with 32...Qxd5.

In Liviu-Dieter Nisipeanu–Anish Giri (see diagram), Giri (Black) played 
30... Bxh3 

overloading the g2-pawn, as 31.gxh3 is met with 31...f3 32.Re3 Qg5+. After 31.Qc3 Bg4, Nisipeanu resigned.

An overload was also used in Rotlewi versus Rubinstein.

References

Chess tactics
Chess terminology